Juan Francisco "Manzanon" Hernández Díaz (born 24 June 1978) is a Peruvian footballer who plays as a centre– back. He currently plays for Cobresol in the Torneo Descentralizado. He is the older brother of Luis Alberto Hernández.

Club career
Juan Francisco Hernández made his debut in Torneo Descentralizado in the 1998 season with Unión Minas.

Then in January 2000 he joined Juan Aurich.

International career
Hernández made his debut for the Peru national team in 2001.

References

1978 births
Living people
Footballers from Lima
Association football central defenders
Peruvian footballers
Peru international footballers
Unión Minas footballers
Juan Aurich footballers
Club Alianza Lima footballers
Alianza Atlético footballers
Club Deportivo Universidad César Vallejo footballers
Unión Huaral footballers
Cienciano footballers
FBC Melgar footballers
Sport Boys footballers
Cobresol FBC footballers
Peruvian Primera División players